Sound Dimension (previously named The Soul Vendors) was a Jamaican reggae band formed in 1967 in Kingston, Jamaica. They were the house band at Clement "Coxsone" Dodd's Studio One. They were named after a piece of studio equipment called the Sound Dimension. Their 1967 recorded track "Real Rock" became a famous riddim.

Members
Membership varied from time to time. The following musicians appear on Sound Dimension recordings:
 Vocals: Leroy Sibbles
 Guitar: Eric Frater, Ernest Ranglin
 Bass; Boris Gardiner, Leroy Sibbles
 Keyboards: Richard Ace, Robbie Lyn, Jackie Mittoo
 Saxophone: Headley Bennett, Cedric Brooks, Karl Bryan
 Trombone: Vin Gordon
 Percussion: Fil Callender, Enid Campbell, Denzel Laing, Leroy Wallace
 Drums: Fil Callender, Joe Isaacs, Leroy Wallace

References

Jamaican reggae musical groups
Jamaican backing bands